Summer Games II is an Olympic sports video game developed and published by Epyx in North America, and published by U.S. Gold in Europe, based on sports featured in the Summer Olympic Games. It is a sequel to Summer Games released by Epyx the previous year. Summer Games II was originally written for the Commodore 64 and ported to the Apple II, Atari ST, MS-DOS, ZX Spectrum, Amstrad CPC and Amiga.

Gameplay
The game was presented as a virtual multi-sport carnival called the "Epyx Games" (there was no official IOC licensing in place) with up to 8 players each choosing a country to represent, and then taking turns competing in various events to try for a medal. World records could be saved to the game disk.

The game features the following eight events: Triple jump, High jump, Rowing, Javelin throw, Equestrian, Fencing, Kayaking, Cycling.

The game allows the player to compete in all of the events sequentially, compete in some events, choose just one event, or practice an event. This version also features both the opening and closing ceremonies, where the closing ceremonies features a "fan man", the flame extinguishing as the sky goes dark, a blimp passing by and some fireworks. Certain ports also allow for participants to compete in events from the original Summer Games events, but they had to have the original Summer Games diskette for this to happen.

Ports
The original Commodore 64 version of Summer Games II was created by Scott Nelson, Jon Leupp, Chuck Sommerville, Kevin Norman, Michael Kosaka, and Larry Clague and published in 1985. The same year saw an Apple II version, ported by John Stouffer, Jeff Webb, Doug Matson, Greg Broniak, Tim Grost, Matt Decker, Vera Petrusha, Ken Evans, Pat Findling, Dr. Keith Dreyer, and Chris Oesterling. It became a bestseller in the UK.

A year later it was ported to the IBM PC by Phil Suematsu, Jeff Grigg, Don Hill, and Jimmy Huey. Richard Wilcox and Steve Hawkes ported it to the ZX Spectrum and Amstrad CPC. In 1992 Adam Steele, Phillip Morris, and Dave Lowe ported it to the Atari ST and the Amiga.

Summer Games II was re-released on the Virtual Console in Europe on June 27, 2008 and in North America on March 16, 2009.

A port for the Atari Jaguar CD was under development by Teque London, but work on the port was discontinued sometime in 1995 and it was never released.

Reception
Summer Games II was Epyx's second best-selling Commodore game as of late 1987 after Winter Games. Ahoy! stated that "the production values of Summer Games II are absolutely top of the line, even better than the original Summer Games". The magazine cited equestrian and fencing as the best events, and concluded that it "covers itself with glory from the familiar opening ceremony to the closing festivities. Put simply, if you own a Commodore 64, this disk is a must".

See also
Daley Thompson's Decathlon
Track & Field (video game)

References

External links

Images of Summer Games II box, manual and screen shots

1985 video games
Amiga games
Amstrad CPC games
Apple II games
Atari ST games
Cancelled Atari Jaguar games
Commodore 64 games
DOS games
Epyx games
Summer Olympic video games
Teque London games
U.S. Gold games
Video game sequels
Video games developed in the United States
Virtual Console games
ZX Spectrum games
Multiplayer and single-player video games